Lauri Kolho (born Saxberg, 7 September 1886 – 17 September 1940) was a Finnish sports shooter, who competed at the 1908 and the 1912 Summer Olympics.

Shooting 

Kolho was a board member of the Finnish Shooting Sport Federation in 1922–1923.

Biography 
He performed his matriculation exam in the Vaasa Finnish Lycaeum in 1905. He tended his family farm from 1907.

He fought in the Finnish Civil War, acted as the local chief of Kolho White Guard and in the staff of the Northern Häme White Guard District.

He was active in the Lapua Movement and the Patriotic People's Movement.

He died of ileus.

Family 
His parents were farmer Abram Evert Kolho and Eulalia Riihimäki. Olympic shooters Voitto and Yrjö Kolho were his brothers, as was architect Vilho Kolho.

Born Saxberg, they finnicized the family name to Kolho on 12 May 1906.

He married home economics teacher Taimi Helena Ahola (1899–1966). They had four children:
 Ulla Onerva (1931–1993), who married the economist Seppo Konttinen.
 Eila Inkeri (1932–)
 Vilma Kaarina (1935–)
 Lauri Arimo (1938–)

Sources

References

External links
 

1886 births
1940 deaths
Finnish male sport shooters
Olympic shooters of Finland
Shooters at the 1908 Summer Olympics
Shooters at the 1912 Summer Olympics
People from Keuruu
Sportspeople from Central Finland